Bon Voyage! is a 1962 American comedy film directed by James Neilson and produced by Walt Disney Productions. It stars Fred MacMurray, Jane Wyman, Deborah Walley, Tommy Kirk, and Kevin Corcoran as the Willard family on a European holiday.

The character actor James Millhollin appears in the film as the ship's librarian.

Plot

Harry Willard finally makes good his promise to take his bride of 20 years on a long-delayed trip by ship to Europe. They are accompanied by their 19-year-old son (Elliott), 18-year-old daughter (Amy), and 11-year-old son (Skipper). From the time they arrive at the dock, an unending series of comedy adventures and romantic encounters ensue until, exhausted but happy, they leave with memories that will stay with them all for years to come.

Cast
 Fred MacMurray as Harry Willard
 Jane Wyman as Katie Willard
 Michael Callan as Nick O'Mara
 Deborah Walley as Amy Willard
 Jessie Royce Landis as Countessa 'La Comtesse' DuFresne 
 Tommy Kirk as Elliott Willard
 Georgette Anys as Madame Clebert
 Kevin Corcoran as Skipper Willard
 Ivan Desny as Rudolph Hunschak
 Françoise Prévost as The Girl
 Alex Gerry as Horace Bidwell
 Howard Smith as Judge Henderson
 Max Showalter as The Tight Suit
 James Millhollin as Ship's Librarian 
 Marcel Hillaire as Sewer Guide
 Richard Wattis as Party Guest

Production
The film was based on a 1956 novel by Joseph and Merrijane Hayes. Joseph Hayes had written The Desperate Hours and Bon Voyage was his second book; he and his wife wrote it after taking a trip across the Atlantic.

Film rights were bought by Universal before the book had even been published for $125,000 and it was announced the film would be produced by Ross Hunter and written by the Hayes'. Esther Williams was originally announced as star. Then, James Cagney was going to play the lead. Filming dates were pushed back when Bing Crosby was linked to the project.

In early 1960, it was announced Disney had optioned the novel. Disney said it was likely Ken Annakin would direct with Karl Malden, James MacArthur and Janet Munro to star. Later, Robert Stevenson was announced as director.

"It's far out for us", said Disney, "but still Disney. I'm really a gag man and missed the kind of pictures Frank Capra and Harold Lloyd used to make. Since nobody else wanted to do them, I decided to make them myself."

Eventually, Fred MacMurray, Jane Wyman, and Tommy Kirk were confirmed as the three leads. However, casting the daughter proved more difficult. "You must build a picture", said Walt Disney. "You don't write it all – only part of it. And it's the light and comic picture that's toughest of all to build."

Michael Callan was cast from the play of West Side Story. Deborah Walley was cast on the basis of her performance in Gidget Goes Hawaiian.

Filming began on 15 August 1961. It took place partly on location on a genuine ocean cruiser travelling across the Atlantic and in France. Walt Disney accompanied the film on location.

Tommy Kirk did not get along with Jane Wyman:
I thought Jane Wyman was a hard, cold woman and I got to hate her by the time I was through with Bon Voyage. Of course, she didn't like me either, so I guess it came natural. I think she had some suspicion that I was gay and all I can say is that, if she didn't like me for that, she doesn't like a lot of people.
The title song was written by Disney staff songwriters, Robert B. Sherman and Richard M. Sherman.

Reception

Box office
Bon Voyage! grossed $9,082,042 in the United States and earned $5 million in theatrical rentals. According to Kinematograph Weekly the film was considered a "money maker" at the British box office in 1962.

Critical
Bosley Crowther of The New York Times wrote, "Everything possibly unearthable in the way of an obvious cliché involving the hick behavior of American tourists abroad seems to have been dug out from somewhere by the screen-playwright, Bill Walsh, and made to fit into this enactment of a family's vacation odyssey."

Variety stated, "Walt Disney dishes up another comedy blockbuster in this rollicking tour de force of an American family seeing Europe for the first time." Philip K. Scheuer of the Los Angeles Times declared it "the half-year's funniest farce."

Brendan Gill of The New Yorker wrote that Disney "always manages to put a pleasing, no-expense-spared shine on his goods, but in this case the goods go back at least as far as Mark Twain and his 'Innocents Abroad,' and maybe to Sterne and his 'Sentimental Journey.'"

The Monthly Film Bulletin stated, "The film, though unmistakably from the Disney stable, has little of the affectionately zany humor that so unexpectedly enlivened The Parent Trap and The Absent-Minded Professor."

Awards
The film was nominated for two Academy Awards.
 Costume Design (Color)-(Bill Thomas)
 Sound (Robert O. Cook)

References

External links

1962 films
American comedy films
Walt Disney Pictures films
Works by the Sherman Brothers
Films directed by James Neilson
Films produced by Walt Disney
Films set in France
Films about vacationing
Films scored by Paul Smith (film and television composer)
1960s English-language films
1960s American films